Ahmar Ashfaq (born 18 October 1996) is a Pakistani cricketer. He made his List A debut for Multan in the 2018–19 Quaid-e-Azam One Day Cup on 6 September 2018. He made his first-class debut for Multan in the 2018–19 Quaid-e-Azam Trophy on 8 September 2018.

References

External links
 

1996 births
Living people
Pakistani cricketers
Multan cricketers